is a passenger railway station in located in the town of Nachikatsuura, Higashimuro District, Wakayama Prefecture, Japan, operated by West Japan Railway Company (JR West).

Lines

Station layout
The station consists of a single island platform connected to the station building by a level crossing. The station is unattended.

Platforms

History
Yukawa Station was opened on July 18, 1935. With the privatization of the Japan National Railways (JNR) on April 1, 1987, the station came under the aegis of the West Japan Railway Company.

Passenger statistics
In fiscal 2019, the station was used by an average of 6 passengers daily (boarding passengers only).

Surrounding Area
 Yukawa Beach
 Yukawa Onsen
 Natsuyama Onsen

See also
List of railway stations in Japan

References

External links

 Yukawa Station (West Japan Railway) 

Railway stations in Wakayama Prefecture
Railway stations in Japan opened in 1935
Nachikatsuura